Abbie Palmer (born 30 October 1997 in Whangarei) is a New Zealand professional squash player. As of February 2018, she was ranked number 90 in the world.

References

1997 births
Living people
New Zealand female squash players
20th-century New Zealand women
21st-century New Zealand women
Squash players at the 2022 Commonwealth Games
Commonwealth Games competitors for New Zealand
Sportspeople from Whangārei